Mosé Navarra (born 18 July 1974, in Loano) is a retired tennis player from Italy.

Navarra turned professional in 1993.  The left-hander reached his highest individual ranking on the ATP Tour on 14 June 1999, when he became the number 119 in the world.

Personal life

Navarra was married to Indian model Sheetal Mallar for three years.

Junior Grand Slam finals

Singles: 1 (1 runner-up)

ATP career finals

Doubles: 1 (1 runner-up)

ATP Challenger and ITF Futures finals

Singles: 5 (3–2)

Doubles: 7 (3–4)

Performance timelines

Singles

Doubles

References

External links
 
 

1974 births
Living people
Italian male tennis players
Sportspeople from the Province of Savona
Mediterranean Games gold medalists for Italy
Mediterranean Games medalists in tennis
Competitors at the 1993 Mediterranean Games
20th-century Italian people